Aspicilia confusa is a pale gray (sometimes brownish) crustose areolate lichen that grows mostly on rock in southern and central California mountains, from . Areoles may be contiguous or dispersed. It has a dark, fringed prothallus. Each areole commonly has 1–4 round to angular aspicilioid apothecia that are 0.1–1.5 mm in diameter, sunken into it. Each apothecia has a usually concave, black disc. Lichen spot tests are all negative. It grows on rock in chaparral or forests in central and southern California, including the Sierra Nevadas, but not in the southeastern deserts of California.

References

Lichen species
Lichens of North America
Pertusariales
Lichens described in 2007